Opera Factory was an experimental opera ensemble founded by Australian director David Freeman.  It operated in Zurich from 1976 to 1995 and in London from 1982 to 1998. In the 1980s when the company worked with the London Sinfonietta, its productions were billed as Opera Factory London Sinfonietta (OFLS). Known for its avant garde and often controversial productions, the company's 1986 Così fan tutte  was described by The Guardian's music critic, Andrew Clements as one of the "ten productions that changed British opera".

Opera Factory aimed to bring the techniques of Peter Brook and Jerzy Grotowski to music drama. David Freeman wrote that it would "have the luxury of being able to question many of the assumptions about opera and its role in society which a large company, because of its very size, can afford neither the time nor the money to do". He expressed a similar sentiment in a 1989 profile in Opera magazine where he criticised the approach of major opera houses, such as the Royal Opera House, Metropolitan Opera, and La Scala, which viewed opera productions as largely defined by their costumes: "It's museum art taken to its logical conclusion."

History
David Freeman (b. 1952) began the first incarnation of Opera Factory in Sydney in 1972 while he was still a student. He then moved to Switzerland when his friend and fellow student at the University of Sydney, the opera singer Leslie Stephenson, joined Zurich Opera for further training. In 1976, Freeman, Stephenson, and the conductor Brenton Langbein founded Opera Factory Zurich with Langbein as its first music director. In 1981 the company brought their production of Handel's Acis and Galatea to London encouraged by Lord Harewood, who at the time was the managing director of English National Opera. He also encouraged them to set up a permanent London branch. The original plan was for the company to be supported by the ENO, but a permanent deal never materialised. However, with the proceeds from their productions and the support of the London Sinfonietta and later the South Bank as well as grants from Arts Council England, the London company survived until 1998. Its last production was And the Snake Sheds Its Skin, with text by David Freeman and music by the Senegalese pop composer Habib Faye. The Zurich branch of the Opera Factory continued in parallel until 1995 when it lost its subsidy from the city of Zurich. Opera Factory Zurich's last productions were a joint run of Britten's Curlew River and Purcell's Dido and Aeneas.

Productions
Opera Factory's London productions included:

Notes

References

External links
Biography of David Freeman on the official website of Opera Australia

British opera companies
Swiss opera companies